Joseph-Alcide Savoie (June 5, 1872 – February 4, 1933) was a Canadian politician.

Born in Saint-Albert-de-Warwick, Quebec, the son of François-Théodore Savoie, Savoie was acclaimed to the Legislative Assembly of Quebec for Nicolet in a 1917 by-election. A Liberal, he was acclaimed again in 1919. He was elected in 1923, 1927, and 1931. He died in office in Sherbrooke, Quebec.

References

1872 births
1933 deaths
People from Centre-du-Québec
Quebec Liberal Party MNAs